Elachista justificata is a moth of the family Elachistidae that is found in South Africa.

References

Endemic moths of South Africa
justificata
Moths described in 1926
Moths of Africa